Methylobacterium goesingense  is a bacterium from the genus of Methylobacterium which has been isolated from the endospores from the plant Thlapi goesingense in Austria. Methylobacterium goesingense is highly resistant to nickel.

References

Further reading

External links
Type strain of Methylobacterium goesingense at BacDive -  the Bacterial Diversity Metadatabase

Hyphomicrobiales
Bacteria described in 2012